Luthfur Rahman  (born October 1976) is a British Labour Party politician, serving as the deputy leader of Manchester City Council since 2021. In May 2008, he became the first person of Bangladeshi origin to be elected a Councillor on Manchester City Council.

Early life
Rahman was born into a Bengali Muslim family from Shathal in Patli, Jagannathpur in the Sunamganj District of Bangladesh. He is the eldest son of Surabur Rahman, best known as the president of the Greater Manchester Awami League and former chairman of the Shahjalal Mosque and Islamic Centre in Manchester, who migrated to Manchester in 1968 and settled in Longsight. 

In 1980 at the age of three Luthfur along with his mother and his siblings joined his father in the UK. He attended local schools St Agnes Primary School and Burnage High School. He would later return to St Agnes Primary School as a School governor and to Burnage High School mentoring for Mosaic Network.

Rahman started his working life in the restaurant trade, working his way up from a waiter to a chef and then manager. At the age of 17, he left Stockport College and opened his own restaurant in Wilmslow. Over the next 22 years, he continued working in the catering trade establishing several different successful restaurants and takeaways. He is a qualified financial adviser and has also worked as an intermediary.

Career
Rahman was first elected to Manchester City Council in 2008 taking the seat from the Liberal Democrats with a swing of over 30 per cent gaining a majority of 1147. He was re-elected in 2012 doubling his majority. In 2010 Rahman was elected by fellow Councillors to be the lead member for the race and equality portfolio at Manchester City Council.

Rahman is Chair of the Young Foundation’s Uprising programme in Greater Manchester which he brought to 
North West England. Rahman was the first Councillor on Manchester City Council to call for the introduction of the living wage in Manchester.

Recognition
In 2011 Rahman was awarded the Community Champion of the Year at the Local Government Information Unit Councillor Awards. The Local Government Information Unit described Rahman as having

Arts Council England have said of Rahman 

He was appointed Officer of the Order of the British Empire (OBE) in the 2020 Birthday Honours for services to local government.

See also
British Bangladeshi
List of British Bangladeshis
List of ethnic minority British politicians

References

External links

Manchester City Council Profile

1976 births
Living people
21st-century British politicians
Politicians from Manchester
Labour Party (UK) councillors
Councillors in Manchester
Officers of the Order of the British Empire
People from Longsight
English politicians
English Muslims
English Sunni Muslims
Bangladeshi Muslims
Bangladeshi emigrants to England
Naturalised citizens of the United Kingdom
English people of Bangladeshi descent
British politicians of Bangladeshi descent
People from Patli Union